Srednje Brdo is a settlement north of Hotavlje in the Municipality of Gorenja Vas–Poljane in the Upper Carniola region of Slovenia. It includes the hamlets of Loge and Toplice.

References

External links

Srednje Brdo on Geopedia

Populated places in the Municipality of Gorenja vas-Poljane